Ethel Bidwell (1919–2003) was a British research scientist who investigated blood coagulation.

In 1950, Bidwell, an enzyme chemist, joined the Oxford University team headed by Gwyn Macfarlane. Two years later, she began to study plasma concentration and selective extraction of factor VIII.

By 1953 she had devised a technique to extract and concentrate bovine factor VIII that was 8000 times stronger than human plasma.

In 1959 she was working on the preparation of human coagulation factors at the Medical Research Council Blood Coagulation Research Unit at Churchill Hospital, Headington, Oxford.

Tilli Tansey wrote of inviting Bidwell to a witness seminar convened by the History of Modern Biomedicine Research Group:

Further reading

References

External links 

 

1919 births
Place of birth missing
2003 deaths
Place of death missing
British scientists
Haemophilia
British medical researchers